Internationalist Theatre is a London theatre company founded by South African Greek actress Angelique Rockas in September 1980. The company was originally named New Internationalist Theatre, with an intention to pursue an internationalist approach in its choice of plays as well as "a multi-racial drama policy, with an even mix of performers drawn from different cultural groups", The Stage, April 1981.

The theatre has received coverage from stage papers around the world. It received charity status in 1986.

Performances
The Internationalist Theatre has put on plays by  Jean Genet (The Balcony), Griselda Gambaro (The Camp),                                                                                                                                                                                                                                                                                                                                                          
Brecht (Mother Courage and Her Children), Luigi Pirandello (Liolà), Tennessee Williams (In the Bar of a Tokyo Hotel), August Strindberg (Miss Julie) and Maxim Gorky (Enemies). Their critical reception was generally favourable, although not universally. Time Out 
magazine disliked their production of Mother Courage: "the casting only inspires a whole host of irreverent questions: what on earth, say, is an American sergeant doing in seventeenth century Europe? And how did a Pakistani chaplain get into the Swedish army?"    an example of the resistance to diversity casting at this point of time to a theatre first of a multi-racial Mother Courage production. 
The Pakistani actor referred to by Malcolm Hay was the veteran Asian Parsi actor Renu Setna. The Financial Times found Liolà`s  multi-national casting problematic: "do we really need this peculiar medley of Italian accents for the English premiere? The problem is compounded by the commitment ... to a multi-national cast ... English, German, Sicilian, and Italian actors produce widely differing versions of the Latin lilt"

See also 
Intercultural theatre
Political drama

References

External links
 Bertolt-Brecht-Archiv Akademie der Künste  Mother Courage and Her Children
 The records of Internationalist Theatre, London, 1983-1985; New Internationalist Theatre, London, 1981-1982   are held by the British Library.
University College Dublin  Index to Pirandello Studies, Vol 3 (1983), Liola p. 100-102
  Practitioner focus: Angelique Rockas | Drama And Theatre 
 Internationalist Theatre in Academia.edu

Women in theatre
Theatre in London
Feminist theatre
Political theatre
Theatre companies in London
Theatre companies in the United Kingdom
Entertainment companies established in 1981
Modernist theatre
Alternative theatre
1981 establishments in the United Kingdom
Theatre practitioners
1981 establishments in England
Defunct companies based in London